Pedotope is the total soil component of the abiotic matrix present in an ecotope. The pedotope is not one particular kind of soil, nor even the dominant kind of soil available in a location, but rather the total soil component (of all varieties) available in the location.

References
 Kratochwil, Anselm. Biodiversity in Ecosystems: Principles and Case Studies of Different Complexity Levels. Series: Tasks for Vegetation Science, XXXIV. Dordrecht, Germany: Kluwer Academic Publishers, 1999. .

See also
 Ecological land classification

Pedology